The Nalut Dinosaur Museum is a paleontological museum located in Nalut, Libya. The fossils, which date from the Cretaceous period, were discovered by a joint expedition of Libyan geologists and American paleontologists.  The collection is housed in a wing of the Red Crescent building in Nalut.

See also 

 List of museums in Libya

References 

Museums with year of establishment missing
Museums in Libya
Tripolitania
Dinosaur museums